René Müller (born 11 February 1959) is a German football coach and former player who played as a goalkeeper.

Career
Müller was first-choice goalkeeper of the East Germany national team for much of the 1980s, and was twice East German Footballer of the Year. He played for 1. FC Lokomotive Leipzig for fourteen years, and later had spells with FC Sachsen Leipzig, 1. FC Dynamo Dresden and FC St. Pauli. 

After his retirement Müller became a coach. He managed 1. FC Nürnberg II from 2007 until 11 April 2011.

Honours
FDGB-Pokal: 1980–81, 1985–86, 1986–87
UEFA Cup Winners' Cup: runner-up 1986–87

References

External links
 

1959 births
Living people
Footballers from Leipzig
German footballers
East German footballers
East Germany international footballers
Association football goalkeepers
1. FC Lokomotive Leipzig players
Dynamo Dresden players
FC Sachsen Leipzig players
FC St. Pauli players
Bundesliga players
2. Bundesliga players
DDR-Oberliga players
German football managers
Hallescher FC managers
FC Rot-Weiß Erfurt managers
People from Bezirk Leipzig